Dendrobium bellatulum (enchanting dendrobium) is a species of orchid. It is native to the eastern Himalayas (Yunnan, Assam, Arunachal Pradesh) and northern Indochina (Myanmar, Thailand, Vietnam, Laos).

References

bellatulum
Orchids of Asia
Flora of East Himalaya
Flora of Indo-China